Sanjay Jagtap is a leader of Indian National Congress and a member of the Maharashtra Legislative Assembly elected from Purandar Assembly constituency in Pune city.

Positions held
 2019: Elected to Maharashtra Legislative Assembly.

References

Living people
Year of birth missing (living people)
Maharashtra MLAs 2019–2024
Indian National Congress politicians from Maharashtra
People from Pune